The Rhymney R class was a class of 0-6-2T steam locomotive introduced into traffic in 1907 designed by the railway's engineer Hurry Riches.

History
There were initially three locos in the class augmented to five in 1909. They were built by Robert Stephenson, though in 1921 Hudswell Clarke built four and Beyer, Peacock and Company contributed a further six.

The R class and related 1904-introduced M and 1910 A classes were successful designs ideally suited to hauling heavy coal trains a relatively short distance.  In 1926, No 17 was reboilered by the GWR and in this form was visually almost indistinguishable from the GWR 5600 Class.

Thus the R (and closely related "Stephenson" M class, A, A1 and larger wheeled P classes) were designed for work on the Rhymney Railway, replacing smaller locomotives.  When the smaller railway companies were forcibly merged into the GWR, these modern 0-6-2's were in generally good order (some were a few months old) and had proved successful. Collectively they became the blueprint for the 200 strong 5600 class.

The design of the 5600 class followed the Rhymney designs quite closely but adopted GWR practice as far as possible, by utilising many standardized parts. Included in Collett's innovations was a standard number 2 boiler which was suitable for the 5600 (and the M and R class Rhymney locomotives), complete with the traditional copper GWR safety valve casing and copper-capped chimney. Some A and P classes were also rebuilt but used the slightly shorter standard number 10 boiler, also to good effect.

Five R class locos were upgraded from 1926 onwards.  All told sixteen "Stephenson" locos were similarly dealt with between 1926 and 1949.

Welsh 0-6-2T types

The railways of South Wales seem to have had a particular liking for the 0-6-2T type.  This was because the nature of the work they undertook demanded high adhesive weight, plenty of power with good braking ability, but no need for outright speed, nor large tanks or bunker as the distances from pit to port were short.  These Welsh locomotives were taken over by the GWR at the grouping in 1923 and many including seventeen of the Rhymney A, M, P and R's were rebuilt with GWR taper boilers.  All the Rhymney Stevenson derived locos passed into British Railways (BR) ownership in 1948.  Others included (with some gaps in numbering):

 Brecon and Merthyr Railway, BR numbers 431-436
 Cardiff Railway, BR number 155
 Rhymney Railway, BR numbers 35-83
 Taff Vale Railway, BR numbers 204-399

For further information on these pre-grouping locomotives see Locomotives of the Great Western Railway.

References

See also
 Welsh 0-6-2T locomotives

External links 

 Rail UK database entry for Rhymney Railway R class
 Rail UK database entry for Rhymney Railway R1 class
 5600 class
 Telford Steam Railway 5619 project
 5643
 6695

R Class
0-6-2T locomotives
Robert Stephenson and Company locomotives
Hudswell Clarke locomotives
Beyer, Peacock locomotives
Railway locomotives introduced in 1907
Scrapped locomotives
Standard gauge steam locomotives of Great Britain
Freight locomotives